Selling is the profession of making sales.

Selling may also refer to:
 Trade
 , a town in Favrskov Municipality, Denmark
 Selling, Kent, a village in England
 Selling (professional wrestling)
 Ben Selling (1853–1931), U.S. businessman and politician
 Eduard Selling (1834–1920), German mathematician
 Margarete Selling, German rower
 Magnus Selling (1903-1986), Swedish philosopher

See also 
 Sell (disambiguation)
 Sale (disambiguation)
 Seling
 Sellin (disambiguation)